Ayle is a village in Northumberland, England, situated to the north of Alston. There are six residences in the hamlet.

Governance 
Ayle is in the parliamentary constituency of Hexham.

References

External links

Villages in Northumberland